The 34th parallel south is a circle of latitude that is 34 degrees south of the Earth's equatorial plane. It crosses the Atlantic Ocean, Africa, the Indian Ocean, Australasia, the Pacific Ocean and South America.

At this latitude the sun is visible for 14 hours, 28 minutes during the December solstice and 9 hours, 50 minutes during the June solstice, and south of which the Crux constellation is circumpolar (figures in the sky all year round). On 21 June, the maximum altitude of the sun is 32.00 degrees, while it's 79.00 degrees on 21 December.

Around the world
Starting at the Prime Meridian and heading eastwards, the parallel 34° south passes through:

{| class="wikitable plainrowheaders"
! scope="col" width="125" | Co-ordinates
! scope="col" | Country, territory or ocean
! scope="col" | Notes
|-
| style="background:#b0e0e6;" | 
! scope="row" style="background:#b0e0e6;" | Atlantic Ocean
| style="background:#b0e0e6;" |
|-
| 
! scope="row" | 
| Western Cape – passing through Cape Town (at )
|-
| style="background:#b0e0e6;" | 
! scope="row" style="background:#b0e0e6;" | Indian Ocean
| style="background:#b0e0e6;" | 
|-
| 
! scope="row" | 
| Eastern Cape
|-
| style="background:#b0e0e6;" | 
! scope="row" style="background:#b0e0e6;" | Indian Ocean
| style="background:#b0e0e6;" | St Francis Bay
|-
| 
! scope="row" | 
| Eastern Cape – passing just south of Port Elizabeth (at )
|-
| style="background:#b0e0e6;" | 
! scope="row" style="background:#b0e0e6;" | Indian Ocean
| style="background:#b0e0e6;" |
|-
| 
! scope="row" | 
| Western Australia
|-
| style="background:#b0e0e6;" | 
! scope="row" style="background:#b0e0e6;" | Indian Ocean
| style="background:#b0e0e6;" |
|-
| 
! scope="row" | 
| Western Australia – Cape Le Grand
|-
| style="background:#b0e0e6;" | 
! scope="row" style="background:#b0e0e6;" | Indian Ocean
| style="background:#b0e0e6;" |
|-
| 
! scope="row" | 
| Western Australia – Cape Arid
|-
| style="background:#b0e0e6;" | 
! scope="row" style="background:#b0e0e6;" | Indian Ocean
| style="background:#b0e0e6;" | Great Australian Bight
|-
| 
! scope="row" | 
| South Australia – Eyre Peninsula
|-
| style="background:#b0e0e6;" | 
! scope="row" style="background:#b0e0e6;" | Indian Ocean
| style="background:#b0e0e6;" | Spencer Gulf
|-valign="top"
| 
! scope="row" | 
|-valign="top"
| style="background:#b0e0e6;" | 
! scope="row" style="background:#b0e0e6;" | Pacific Ocean
| style="background:#b0e0e6;" | Passing just north of the Three Kings Islands,  (at ) Passing just south of Alejandro Selkirk Island,  (at )
|-
| 
! scope="row" | 
| O'Higgins Region
|-
| 
! scope="row" | 
|Mendoza Province - San Luis Province - Cordoba Province - Santa Fe Province - Buenos Aires Province - Autonomous City of Buenos Aires
|-
| 
! scope="row" | 
| Passing through Laguna Negra (at )
|-
| style="background:#b0e0e6;" | 
! scope="row" style="background:#b0e0e6;" | Atlantic Ocean
| style="background:#b0e0e6;" |
|}

See also
33rd parallel south
35th parallel south

s34